Al-Ansiyin is a sub-district located in Dhi al-Sufal District, Ibb Governorate, Yemen. Al-Ansiyin had a population of 8256 as of 2004.

References 

Sub-districts in Dhi As Sufal District